Alex Vlastaras (born 8 November 1991), commonly known by his stage name Aero Chord, is a Greek electronic trap producer. He is mostly known for his songs within the trap genre, but has also delved into other music genres.

History
Aero Chord began his career in 2011. In his interview in 2013 with Your EDM, Vlastaras spoke on the origins of the name Aero Chord, stating "Well, my name wasn't something easy to decide on. It took me at least 2 months of looking through name generators and combining their outputs endlessly until something good and meaningful and unique came up. When I saw Aero Chord it just clicked I guess. I started producing at the age of 14 I think, inspired by a cousin of mine who was making Goa and psy-trance back then and who helped me through my first steps with Reason. I've never DJ'ed much in my life before Aero Chord, I just knew I have to go through productions first to gain some recognition so I saw no point in it."

Career
Vlastaras has released his music on Monstercat, High Intensity, Trap and Bass and other record labels. His tracks are commonly played on festivals by other popular artists in the electronic music scene, such as Diplo, Skrillex, DJ Snake and RL Grime.

Having performed in festivals including Spring Awakening and Carnival of Bass, he started his first North America tour in June 2015.

Vlastaras' track "Surface" was popularized by YouTube introduction video templates, entertainment videos by various YouTube personalities and the Need for Speed gameplay demo at the Electronic Entertainment Expo 2015, gaining over 50 million views on YouTube as of 30 July 2018. Other tracks including "Ctrl Alt Destruction", "Boundless" and "Break Them" are also frequently used in various YouTube videos.

In 2020, he was dropped by Monstercat after British future house vocalist Mylk posted an accusation of sexual assault by Aero Chord on her social media account.

Discography

Extended plays 
 Mechanical Mayhem (2013, Bonerizing Records)
 New Breed Part 1 (2014, High Intensity Records)
 Love & Hate (2016, Monstercat)
 The Sound (2019, Monstercat)
 Psyops (2022, Aero Records)
 Psyops 2 (2022, Aero Records)

Albums 
 Grind (2020, Aero Records)
V8 (2021, Aero Records)

Singles 
 "Battle Cry" (2013, self-released)
 "Android Talk" (2013, Dominance Records)
 "No Half Steppin'" (2013, self-released)
 "Ctrl Alt Destruction" (2013, self-released)
 "Mortar" (2013, self-released)
 "Prime Time" (2013, self-released)
 "Time Leap" (2013, NoCopyrightSounds)
 "Shootin' Stars" (with Ddark) (2014, NoCopyrightSounds)
 "Blvde" (2014, self-released)
 "Secret" (with Gawtbass) (2014, self-released)
 "Surface" (2014, Monstercat) — #23 on Billboard Twitter Emerging Artists
 "Bouzouki" (2014, self-released)
 "Heart Attack" (2014, self-released)
 "Boundless" (2014, Monstercat)
 "Break Them" (feat. Anna Yvette) (2014, Monstercat)
 "Saiko" (2015, Monstercat)
 "Titans" (with Razihel) (2015, Monstercat)
 "4U" (2015, Monstercat)
 "Be Free" (with Klaypex) (2015, Monstercat)
 "The 90s" (2016, Monstercat)
 "Resistance" (2017, Monstercat)
 "Borneo" (with Wolfgang Gartner) (2017, Monstercat)
 "Incomplete" (with Anuka) (2017, NoCopyrightSounds)
 "Incomplete VIP" (with Anuka and DDark) (2017, NoCopyrightSounds)
 "Shadows" (featuring Nevve) (2018, Monstercat)
 "Confession" (with Kirsten Collins) (2018, self-released)
 "Svnset" (with Norman Perry) (2018, self-released)
 "Play Your Part" (2018, Monstercat)
 "Take Me Home" (featuring Nevve) (2019, Monstercat)
 "Panther" (with Teknicolor) (2019, self-released)
 "Technique" (2020, Aero Records)
"Anthem" (2020, Aero Records)
"Lambo" (2020, Aero Records)
"Grind" (2020, Aero Records)
"Will You Take The Green Herb?" (2022, Aero Records)
"Beach Drive" (2022, Aero Records)
"122" (2022, Aero Records)
"Ancients" (2022, Aero Records)
"Move" (2022, Aero Records)
"911" (2022, Aero Records)
"Who Did the Most" (2022, Aero Records)
"Thoughts Become" (2022, Aero Records)

As featured artist 
 ShikaP - "Hanattak" (featuring Aero Chord) (2014)

Other songs 
 "Drop It" (2017, Monstercat, Rocket League x Monstercat Vol. 1)

Remixes 

 Televisor - "Old Skool" (2013)
 Dada Life – "Bass Don't Cry" (2013)
 Pegboard Nerds & Tristam – "Razor Sharp" (2013)
 Dada Life – "Arrive Beautiful Leave Ugly" (2013)
 Dada Life – "So Young So High" (2013)
 Diamond Pistols – "Twerk" (featuring Anna Yvette) (2013)
 Alex Balog – "Never Stop" (featuring Edward McEvenue) (2013)
 Bro Safari x UFO! – "Drama" (2014)
 Pegboard Nerds – "20K" (2014)
 Bang La Decks – "Utopia" (2014)
 The Chainsmokers – "Selfie" (2014)
 Krewella – "Live for the Night" (2014)
 Scndl - "The Munsta" (2014)
 The Pitcher – "Savor Time" (2014)
 LeKtriQue and Seek N Destroy – "Atomic" (2014)
 Revolvr and Genesis feat. Splitbreed – "Unstoppable" (2014)
 Excision & Pegboard Nerds - "Bring The Madness" (featuring Mayor Apeshit) (2015)
 Major Lazer x DJ Snake – "Lean On" (featuring MØ) (2015)
 Jack Ü feat. Bunji Garlin – "Jungle Bae" (2015)
 Bro Safari – "Scumbag" (2015)
 GTA - "Red Lips" (featuring Sam Bruno) (2015)
 Above & Beyond – "Fly to New York" (featuring Zoe Johnston) (2015)
 Jessie J – "Burnin' Up" (featuring 2 Chainz) (2016)
 Pegboard Nerds & Nghtmre feat. Krewella - "Superstar" (2017)
 Kodak Black – "Zeze" (2018)
 DJ Snake - "Taki Taki" (2018)

References

1991 births
21st-century Greek musicians
Greek DJs
Living people
Remixers
NoCopyrightSounds artists
Electronic dance music DJs
Greek emigrants to the United States